Trevor Leighton (born 1957) is a Carlisle-born photographer whose work features in galleries, most notably the National Portrait Gallery, of which he has the largest number of photographs on display by a single photographer.

He is known for his celebrity and fashion work. Some names include British stars Kate Bush, Dawn French, John Hurt, Bob Monkhouse, and Lisa Snowden and international stars such as Indian actress Kareena Kapoor. He is also known for his photography work for The Fairtrade Foundation, and has photographed stars Vic Reeves, Amanda Burton, Fearne Cotton, Richard Wilson, Harry Hill and others.

Leighton is the author of a book called "The Jokers". It is a coffee-table tome featuring portraits of television comedians, radio and the stage, and these photographs have also featured in a National Portrait Gallery touring exhibition entitled "Comedians: From the 1940s to Now".

His portrait of Jennifer Saunders and Joanna Lumley, the stars of Absolutely Fabulous, was among the British 'faces of the century' in a National Portrait Gallery exhibition in 1999.

References

1957 births
Living people
People from Carlisle, Cumbria
Photographers from Cumbria